Jason Robert Cadee (born 15 April 1991) is an Australian professional basketball player who last played for the Brisbane Bullets of the National Basketball League (NBL).

Early life and career
Cadee was born and raised in the Sydney suburb of Greenacre. He attended Westfields Sports High School in the nearby suburb of Fairfield West, where he earned Hall of Fame status for basketball. He grew up playing for the Bankstown Bruins junior program.

In 2008, Cadee made his debut in the Waratah League for the Bruins. That same year, he was named the NSW Male Athlete and Basketball Player of the Year. In 2009 and 2010, he attended the Australian Institute of Sport and played for the program's SEABL team. He also played for Bankstown in 2010, earning the Waratah League's Australian U/21 Youth Player of the Year and All-Star Five honours.

In April 2010, Cadee participated in the Nike Hoop Summit in the U.S. for the World Select Team, where he recorded seven points, three rebounds and three assists in a 101–97 loss to the USA Junior Select Team.

In July 2010, just months after signing his first professional contract with the Gold Coast Blaze, Cadee was involved in a car accident on Sydney's M7 Motorway. A semi-trailer had veered out of its lane and pushed him off the road. His car went into a spin and parked itself at right angles across one of Sydney's busiest highways. In an instant, Cadee was crumpled against the middle console of the car. After being trapped for 90 minutes, somehow, he escaped with just a broken pelvis. As a result, his NBL debut was delayed and he was forced to withdraw from the Australian Boomers squad.

Professional career

NBL
Five months after breaking his pelvis, Cadee made his NBL debut for the Gold Coast Blaze on 17 December 2010 against the Townsville Crocodiles. He scored 11 points in his debut, which was his highest scoring game of his rookie season. Cadee's second season in the NBL saw him play in all 31 games for the Blaze.

On 15 May 2012, Cadee signed a two-year deal with the Adelaide 36ers. In 2012–13, Cadee played in all 28 games for the 36ers. In 2013–14, Cadee helped the 36ers reach the NBL Grand Final, where they lost 2–1 to the Perth Wildcats.

In May 2014, Cadee signed with the Sydney Kings. He went on to spend four seasons with the Kings. He averaged career-best numbers with the Kings, including scoring a career-high 28 points in December 2015.

On 19 April 2018, Cadee signed a three-year deal with the Brisbane Bullets. In February 2020, he was named the NBL Best Sixth Man for the 2019–20 season.

On 2 July 2021, Cadee re-signed with the Bullets on a two-year deal. On 20 March 2022, he recorded the 1000th assist of his NBL career in a game against the Cairns Taipans. In November 2022, he played his 350th NBL game.

Off-season stints
In 2011 and 2012, Cadee played in the Waratah League for the Bankstown Bruins. In 2013, he played for the West Adelaide Bearcats of the Central ABL.

In 2014, Cadee moved to New Zealand to play for the Super City Rangers. He won the league's scoring title and earned All-Star Five honours. He returned to the Bruins following his stint with the Rangers. In 2015, he returned for a second season with the Rangers.

In 2016, Cadee helped the Bruins win the Waratah League championship.

In February 2017, following the conclusion of the 2016–17 NBL season, Cadee ventured to Europe to play for Greek team Kymis. In eight games to complete the 2016–17 Greek League season, he averaged 11.4 points, 2.1 rebounds, 2.3 assists and 1.5 steals per game.

In 2019, Cadee played for the Brisbane Capitals in the Queensland Basketball League (QBL) and earned league MVP and All-League Team honours. He also led them to the QBL championship. He returned to the Capitals in 2020 and helped them win the Queensland State League (QSL).

In February 2021, Cadee signed with the Gold Coast Rollers for the 2021 NBL1 North season. He re-signed with the Rollers in January 2022 and went on to lead them to the NBL1 North championship while earning Finals MVP honours.

National team career
In May 2008, Cadee was selected to the Australian Emus squad for the first time. He subsequently played for the Emus at the 2009 FIBA Under-19 World Championship, where in nine games, he averaged 9.1 points, 2.3 rebounds and 1.9 assists per name.

In 2012, Cadee played for Australia in the Stanković Cup. The team finished second and Cadee was named to the All-Star Five.

In 2013, Cadee played for Australia against China in a four-game series. He also played in the Stanković Cup and the World University Games, of which Australia won gold and silver respectively. Cadee then narrowly missed out on the Boomers squad for the 2013 FIBA Oceania Championship against New Zealand.

In 2017, Cadee helped the Boomers win gold at the FIBA Asia Cup.

Personal
Cadee has a strong basketball family. His mother, Debbie (née Lee), played for the Australian Opals at the 1984 Olympic Games in Los Angeles, and his father, Robbie, played for the Boomers at the 1976 Olympics in Montreal, and later coached the Opals at the 1988 Olympics in Seoul.

References

External links
Sydney Kings player profile
NBL stats
Waratah League stats
Cadee's mystery hero

1991 births
Living people
Australian men's basketball players
Adelaide 36ers players
Australian expatriate sportspeople in New Zealand
Australian expatriate basketball people in Greece
Australian Institute of Sport basketball players
Basketball players from Sydney
Brisbane Bullets players
Gold Coast Blaze players
Kymis B.C. players
Point guards
Super City Rangers players
Sydney Kings players
Universiade medalists in basketball
Basketball players at the 2018 Commonwealth Games
Commonwealth Games gold medallists for Australia
Commonwealth Games medallists in basketball
Expatriate basketball people in New Zealand
Universiade silver medalists for Australia
Medalists at the 2013 Summer Universiade
Medallists at the 2018 Commonwealth Games